Cedar Lake may refer to one of eighteen lakes of that name in Ontario, Canada:

Cedar Lake in Algoma District, National Topographic System (NTS) Map Sheet 
In Frontenac County:
Cedar Lake, NTS Map Sheet 
Cedar Lake, NTS Map Sheet 
Cedar Lake, NTS Map Sheet 31C10
Cedar Lake, NTS Map Sheet 
Cedar Lake, NTS Map Sheet 
Cedar Lake in Haliburton County, NTS Map Sheet 
Cedar Lake in Hastings County, NTS Map Sheet 
Cedar Lake (Kenora District), NTS Map Sheet 
Cedar Lake in Manitoulin District, NTS Map Sheet 
Cedar Lake (Nipissing District), NTS Map Sheet 
Cedar Lake in Rainy River District, NTS Map Sheet 
Cedar Lake in Renfrew County, NTS Map Sheet 
Cedar Lake in Sudbury District, NTS Map Sheet 
In Thunder Bay District:
Cedar Lake, NTS Map Sheet 
Cedar Lake, NTS Map Sheet 
Cedar Lake, NTS Map Sheet 
Cedar Lake, NTS Map Sheet 

There is also a lake named Cedar Lakes in Algoma District.

References

Lakes of Ontario